ESCP Business School is a French business school and grande école founded in Paris and based across Europe with campuses in Paris, Berlin, London, Madrid, Turin, and Warsaw. It is consistently ranked among the best business schools in Europe. In France, ESCP is one of the most prestigious and selective grandes écoles. It is known as one of the trois Parisiennes (three Parisians), together with HEC Paris and ESSEC. Established in 1819, it is considered the world's oldest business school.

History

The school was established in Paris on 1 December 1819 by two former Napoleonic soldiers, Germain Legret and Amédée Brodart. Germain Legret had founded two business schools in Paris in 1815 and 1818, but both closed their doors rapidly. It was modelled on the first grande école, the École Polytechnique, founded by Lazare Carnot and Gaspard Monge, but was initially more modest, in large part because it had not been supported by the state. The school had gained international exposure since the 1820s, but it was not the only business school open to international students. Its stature and importance ascended during the 19th century and it moved to its current Parisian location on the Avenue de la République in 1898.

In 1828, the project to put the school under the authority of the French Ministry of Commerce and Industry failed. The school remained independent by the intervention of Jérôme-Adolphe Blanqui, who took it over. Several times during the first half of the 19th century, French political developments resulted in plans to group ESCP with elite French engineering schools such as the École Polytechnique or the École Centrale Paris, but this ultimately did not happen. It is worth mentioning that at the time, engineering schools in France and in Europe taught future businessmen. From 1838, the French state began to fund scholarships meant for ESCP's students.

In 1869, the Paris Chamber of Commerce took over the school, aiming to train future business leaders in modern methods in commerce and industry. In 1892, ESCP set up selective admissions processes, which continued to be retained and, today, take the form of competitive exams.

On 5 April 1973, the concept of a multi-campus business school was created, with consecutive inaugurations of campuses taking place in the United Kingdom (London in 1974, move to Oxford in 1975) and in Germany (Düsseldorf in 1975, move to Berlin in 1985). In 1974 the ESCP developed courses in entrepreneurship in response to internal and external forces. Since then, the school has deepened its European presence to become an integrated pan-European business school:  In 2018, ESCP became an École consulaire, largely financed by the public Chambers of Commerce in Paris, Berlin, and Turin.
 In 1985, the School's campus in Germany moved from Düsseldorf to Berlin at the invitation of the Government of Berlin.
 In 1988, a fourth campus was opened in Madrid.
 In 1999, ESCP merged with its sister school EAP.
 In 2001, the Master in Management programme taught at ESCP became validated by City University London.
 In 2004, a fifth campus in Turin was founded, whose courses became validated by the University of Turin; Master in Management students can obtain the Italian degree of Laurea Magistrale.
 In 2005, ESCP inaugurated its London campus, having moved from Oxford.
 In 2007, the Master in Management programme was recognised by the Universidad Carlos III de Madrid; students can obtain the Spanish degree of Master Europeo en Administración y Dirección de Empresas.
 In 2015, ESCP established its sixth European campus with its partner Kozminski University in Poland. 
 In 2016, the School decides to strengthen its footprint in Paris by adding a second campus located in the Montparnasse area after buying back Novancia Business School's building. The campus is dedicated to executive programs.
In 2019, the School removed “Europe” from its name, reverting to its original name.

Grande école degrees 

ESCP Business School is a grande école, a French institution of higher education that is separate from, but parallel and often connected to, the main framework of the French public university system. Grandes écoles are elite academic institutions that admit students through an extremely competitive process, and a significant proportion of their graduates occupy the highest levels of French society. Similar to Ivy League universities in the United States, Oxbridge in the UK, and the C9 League in China, graduation from a grande école is considered the prerequisite credential for any top government, administrative and corporate position in France.

The degrees are accredited by the Conférence des Grandes Écoles and awarded by the French Ministry of National Education. Higher education business degrees in France are organized into three levels thus facilitating international mobility: the Licence, or Bachelor's degrees, and the Master's and Doctoral degrees. The Bachelors and the Masters are organized in semesters: 6 for the Bachelors and 4 for the Masters. Those levels of study include various "parcours" or paths based on UE (Unités d'enseignement or Modules), each worth a defined number of European credits (ECTS). A student accumulates those credits, which are generally transferable between paths. A Bachelors is awarded once 180 ECTS have been obtained (bac + 3); a Masters is awarded once 120 additional credits have been obtained (bac +5). The highly coveted PGE (Programme Grand École) ends with the degree of Master in Management (MiM)

Rankings

Campus
ESCP students can study on campuses in France (Paris), the UK (London), Spain (Madrid), Germany (Berlin), Italy (Turin), and Poland (Warsaw). They can spend either 6 months or 1 year on each campus according to their study choices. Each campus has its own specifics and develops programs with local academic institutions. For instance, in Spain, ESCP provides a Master in Business Project Management co-delivered with the Technical University of Madrid and in Italy, a double-degree program is available for engineers together with the Polytechnic University of Turin.

Since 2017, ESCP has had two campuses in Paris, one near the Place de la République (in the 11th arrondissement of Paris) and another one near the Montparnasse Tower (in the 15th arrondissement of Paris). Each campus is dedicated to a specific range of programs. The campus in the 11th arrondissement hosts all the graduate programs whereas the campus in the 15th arrondissement hosts the undergraduate education, the executive education and the school's start-up Incubator, the Blue Factory. This organization is unique to Paris; on every other campus, undergraduate, graduate and executive programmes are dispensed in the same campus.

Partnerships 

ESCP has over 100 partner grandes écoles and universities worldwide, several offering dual degrees.

Exchange
University of Vienna, Austria
Solvay Brussels School of Economics and Management, Belgium
Aarhus School of Business, Denmark
Copenhagen Business School, Denmark
Aalto University School of Business, Finland
WHU – Otto Beisheim School of Management, Germany
Reykjavík University, Iceland
Trinity College Dublin, Ireland
BI Norwegian Business School, Norway
University of Ljubljana, Slovenia
University of Navarra, Spain
University of Gothenburg, Sweden
University of St. Gallen, Switzerland
Sabancı University, Turkey
London Business School, the UK
Imperial College London, the UK

Dual degrees
Universidad de San Andrés, Argentina
Instituto Tecnológico de Buenos Aires, Argentina
HEC Montréal, Canada
Universidad de Chile, Chile
Tongji University, China
Renmin University of China, School of Business, China
Chinese University of Hong Kong, China
École Centrale Paris, France
ENSAE ParisTech, France
Mines ParisTech, France
École Grégoire-Ferrandi, France
Paris 1 Panthéon-Sorbonne University, France
Indian Institutes of Management, India
Polytechnic University of Turin, Italy
Università Ca' Foscari Venezia, Italy
Waseda University, Japan
Monterrey Institute of Technology and Higher Education, Mexico
Rotterdam School of Management, Erasmus University, Netherlands
Kozminski University, Poland
Universidade Católica Portuguesa, Portugal
Higher School of Economics, Russia
Korea University Business School, South Korea
National Chengchi University, Taiwan
Aston University, UK
Cornell University, USA
Massachusetts Institute of Technology, USA
Sotheby's Institute of Art, USA
University of South Carolina, USA
University of Texas at Austin, USA
Centre Franco-Vietnamien de Formation à la Gestion, Vietnam

Notable alumni 

 Business 
 Christophe de Margerie (CEO of TotalEnergies)
 Arnaud de Puyfontaine (CEO of Vivendi)
 Alexandre Ricard (CEO of Pernod Ricard)
 François Pauly (CEO of Edmond de Rothschild Group)
 Véronique Morali (president of Fimalac)
 Edouard de Royere (CEO of Air Liquide)
 Patricia Barbizet (CEO of Christie's, Vice-Chairman of the Board of Kering)
 Renaud de Lesquen (CEO of Givenchy)
 André Lacroix (CEO of Intertek Group plc)
 Patrick Thomas (CEO of Hermès)
 Arnaud Nourry (CEO of Hachette group)
 Antoine Riboud (founder of Danone)
 Thierry de La Tour d'Artaise (CEO of SEB)
Laurent-Éric Le Lay (CEO of Eurosport)
 Stéphan Caron (Head of European Direct Corporate Finance at BlackRock)
 Philippe Heim (CEO of La Banque postale, former deputy CEO of Société Générale)
 Miriem Bensalah-Chaqroun (CEO of Oulmes Mineral Water)
 Patrice Louvet (CEO of Ralph Lauren)
 Christian Latouche (Founder of Fiducial SA)
 Cyrille Vigneron (CEO of Cartier)
 François Lemarchand (Founder of Nature et Découvertes)
 Bertrand Dumazy (CEO of Edenred)
 Sarah Youngwood (Group CFO of UBS)

Politics
 Michel Barnier (Foreign Minister of France from 2004 to 2005)
 Jean-Pierre Raffarin (Prime Minister of France from 2002 to 2005)
 Frédéric Salat-Baroux ( Secretary-General of the Presidency of France from 2005 to 2007)
 François Zocchetto (Senator for Mayenne)
 Roxana Maracineanu (Minister of Youth Affairs and Sports)
 Claude Nougein (Senator of Corrèze)
 Stéphane Valeri (President of the Monégasque National Council from 2018 to 2022)

 Research and education 
 Olivier Blanchard (Chief Economist of the International Monetary Fund from 2008 to 2015, Robert M. Solow Professor Emeritus of Economics at the MIT)
 Agnès Bénassy-Quéré (Director of the Centre d'études prospectives et d'informations internationales)
 Christine Musselin (Scientific director at Sciences Po)
 Michel Wieviorka (French sociologist at EHESS)
 Andreas Kaplan (Marketing Professor at ESCP in Berlin)

 Media and culture 
 Leïla Slimani (Writer, Prix Goncourt laureate in 2016)
 Christophe Barbier (French journalist)
 Irma (singer)
 Hervé Hubert (French television producer)
 Aude Lancelin (French journalist)
 Jean-Marc Lofficier (Writer, publisher)
 Gilles Martin-Chauffier (Writer, Prix Interallié laureate in 1998)
 Hélène Gateau (Journalist, television presenter)

 Sports 
 Stéphane Diagana (Track and field gold medalist)
 Érik Boisse (Fencer gold medalist)
 Valérie Barlois (Fencer gold medalist)
 Anne-Lise Touya (Fencer gold medalist)

 Associations 
 Roger Cukierman (Banker, businessman and president of Conseil représentatif des institutions juives de France)
 Nathalie Boy de la Tour (President of Ligue de football professionnel)

See also
 Chamber of Commerce and Industry of Paris
 HEC Paris
 ESSEC Business School

References

External links

Educational institutions established in 1819
Business schools in France
Business schools in England
Business schools in Germany
Business schools in Spain
Business schools in Italy
Universities and colleges in Berlin
Education in Paris
Education in London
Education in Madrid
Education in Turin
Education in Warsaw
Business schools in Poland